Lloyd Laing may refer to:
 Lloyd Laing (archaeologist)
 Lloyd Laing (entrepreneur)